New Jersey is the fourth studio album by American rock band Bon Jovi, released on September 19, 1988, by Mercury Records. The album was produced by Bruce Fairbairn and recorded at Little Mountain Sound Studios in Vancouver, British Columbia, Canada. The album was the follow-up to the band's third album, Slippery When Wet, and reached number one on the Billboard 200 chart in its second week of release after debuting at number eight. It remained at the top for four consecutive weeks and was Bon Jovi's last album to do so until Lost Highway (2007).

It produced five Billboard Hot 100 top ten hits, the most top ten hits to date for any glam metal album, including "Bad Medicine" and "I'll Be There for You", which both reached number one. The album was certified 7× platinum by the Recording Industry Association of America (RIAA). The album also debuted at number one in the UK and was the band's first UK No. 1 album. New Jersey was released by the Soviet state-owned record label Melodiya, being the first American album to be officially released in the USSR. To celebrate the band's 30th anniversary in 2014, the album was repackaged with bonus tracks.

Background
The album was recorded very shortly after the Slippery When Wet Tour, because the band wanted to prove that they were not just going to be a one hit wonder. The album was initially planned to be a double album; however, this idea was rejected by the record label because they were skeptical about the higher price point and decided they would only release a single album. One working title for the album was Sons of Beaches, which alluded to the title of Slippery When Wet.

Recording and production
The album was produced by Bruce Fairbairn like its predecessor and recorded at Little Mountain Sound Studios in Vancouver, British Columbia, Canada. It marked the final collaboration between Bon Jovi and producer Bruce Fairbairn.

When the Slippery When Wet Tour ended in October 1987, the band were inactive for about three to four weeks. Then Jon Bon Jovi and Richie Sambora began making demos for 17 songs which would make up the first batch of songs written for the album. However, they began to feel a high level of pressure because they did not feel as though they had "the amazing song". Jon Bon Jovi said that "I really wanted to do it again, not for monetary reasons—I have plenty of money—but it was such an amazing feeling to have done what we've done. There was a real fear of not being able to write You Give Love A Bad Name again." Jon Bon Jovi and Richie Sambora sat together and wrote the song "Love Is War" but Jon Bon Jovi wanted to write a song that would prove to be just as successful as "You Give Love a Bad Name" so desperately that it came out with exactly the same chord progression. They later started on the second batch of songs and they wrote "Bad Medicine" and "Born to Be My Baby" with Desmond Child. "Born to Be My Baby" was originally recorded acoustically, however the producer Bruce Fairbairn persuaded them to re-record it with electric instruments in a much more metal style. Jon Bon Jovi has since said that he believed the song would have made number one on the charts if it had been released in its original form. This song has a similar theme to "Livin' on a Prayer", as it is about a young working class couple struggling to make ends meet.

Although the glossy production and anthems from Slippery When Wet remained, the band wished to show a level of diversity on the album. The album is much more experimental with a long, atmosphere-building intro on "Lay Your Hands on Me", harmonica and organ duels on "Homebound Train" and a flamenco guitar intro on "Wild Is the Wind". "Ride Cowboy Ride" is a short song functioning as an introduction to "Stick to Your Guns" and was recorded in mono. The song is credited to "Captain Kidd and King of Swing", the nicknames of Bon Jovi and Sambora.

"Love for Sale" was recorded and engineered by John P. Allen and Chris Cavallaro at Chalet Sound in Allenwood, New Jersey. All pre-production songs were recorded and engineered at Chalet Sound by Allen additional engineering by Cavallaro and Nejat Bekan.

Release and reception
New Jersey debuted at No. 8 on the Billboard 200 chart, but climbed to No. 1 the following week and spent four weeks at the top spot. It eventually sold 7 million copies in the United States. The album debuted at No. 1 in Canada, the United Kingdom, Switzerland, Sweden, New Zealand and Australia. "Bad Medicine" and the ballad "I'll Be There for You" both hit No. 1 on the Billboard Hot 100. "Born to Be My Baby", "Lay Your Hands on Me", and "Living in Sin" reached the Top 10.

New Jersey was released on July 1, 2014, as a 2CD "Deluxe Edition", which included the original album remastered along with b-sides and previously unreleased demos from the New Jersey/Sons of Beaches sessions. The "Super Deluxe Edition" includes both discs plus a DVD containing the documentary Access All Areas: A Rock & Roll Odyssey and New Jersey: The Videos. Both titles were previously available on VHS.

Track listing

2014 deluxe edition

Personnel
Bon Jovi
Jon Bon Jovi – vocals, harmonica, acoustic guitar
Richie Sambora – electric and acoustic guitars, mandolin, backing vocals
Alec John Such – bass, backing vocals
Tico "The Hit Man" Torres – drums, percussion, backing vocals
David Bryan – keyboards, backing vocals

Additional musicians
Scott Fairbairn – cello
Audrey Nordwell – cello
Bruce Fairbairn – additional percussion, horn

Additional credits
Bruce Fairbairn – production
John Allen – engineering
Peter Berring – arrangement, additional vocals, vocal arrangement
Chris Cavallaro – engineering
Bob Rock – engineering, mixing
George Marino – mastering
Isabella Lento, Carmela Lento – photography, unknown association
Hugh Syme – artwork, design
Chris Taylor – engineering assistance
Jim Williams – engineering assistance
Tim White – photography
Cameron Wong – cover photography

Charts

Weekly charts

Year-end charts

Certifications and sales

See also
List of glam metal albums and songs

References

1988 albums
Bon Jovi albums
Mercury Records albums
Vertigo Records albums
Albums produced by Bruce Fairbairn
Albums recorded at Little Mountain Sound Studios